Bronx Community Board 1 is a local government unit of the city of New York, encompassing the neighborhoods of Mott Haven, Melrose, and Port Morris in the borough of the Bronx. It is delimited by the East River, East 149th Street, and Prospect Avenue on the east, East 161st Street (from Prospect Avenue to Third Avenue), East 159th Street (from Third Avenue to Park Avenue), and East 149th Street (from Park Avenue to the Harlem River) on the north, and the Harlem River and Bronx Kill on the west and south.

Community board staff and membership
The current chairman of the Bronx Community board 1 is George Rodriguez, and its district manager is Cedric Loftin.

The City Council members representing the community district are non-voting, ex officio board members. The council members and their council districts are:
 8th NYC Council District - Diana Ayala
 17th NYC Council District - Rafael Salamanca

Demographics
As of the United States 2010 Census, the Community Board has a population of 91,497, up from 82,159 in 2000 and 77,214 in 1990.
Of them, 64,887 (70.9%) are of Hispanic origin, 23,680 (25.9%) are Black, non-Hispanic, 1,428 (1.6%) White, non-Hispanic, 542 (0.6%) are Asian or Pacific Islander, 177 (0.2%) American Indian or Alaska Native, 216 (0.2%) are some other race (non-Hispanic), and 567 (0.6%) of two or more races (non-Hispanic).

References

External links
 
 

Community boards of the Bronx